Rupra Road railway station is a railway station on the East Coast Railway network in the state of Odisha, India. It serves Rupra village. Its code is RPRD. It has three platforms. Passenger, Express trains halt at Rupra Road railway station.

Major trains

 Korba–Visakhapatnam Express
 Dhanbad–Alappuzha Express
 Sambalpur–Rayagada Intercity Express
 Bilaspur–Tirupati Express
 Samata Express
 Samaleshwari Express
 Durg–Jagdalpur Express

See also
 Kalahandi district

References

Railway stations in Kalhandi district
Sambalpur railway division